Ralph Eugene Diffendorfer (August 15, 1879 – January 31, 1951) was an American clergyman.

Biography
He was born on August 15, 1879, at Hayesville, Ohio to Franklin Diffendorfer and Addie Leora Arnold. He was educated at Ohio Wesleyan University, Drew Theological Seminary, and Union Theological Seminary.  He was assistant secretary of the Epworth League from 1902 to 1904, and from 1904 to 1916 was secretary of the Missionary Education Movement of the United States and Canada.  The following year (1916–1917), he was educational secretary of the Board of Home Missions and Church Extension and the Board of Foreign Missions of the Methodist Episcopal Church.  He was associate secretary of the Centenary Commission of the Board of Home Missions and Church Extension in 1918, and in 1919–1920 served as director of the Home Missions Survey of the Inter-church world movement.  In 1920 he was appointed secretary of the department of education of the Committee on Conservation and Advance of the Methodist Episcopal Church in Chicago.

In 1907, he helped Charles C. Overton design and promote the Christian flag.

He died on January 31, 1951, in Madison, New Jersey.

Publications
Child Life in Mission Lands (1904)
Junior Studies in the Life of Christ (1904)
A Modern Disciple of Jesus Christ—David Livingstone (1913)
Thy Kingdom Come (1914)
Missionary Education in Home and School (1917)
The Church and the Community (1920)

People from Ashland County, Ohio
People from Madison, New Jersey
Ohio Wesleyan University alumni
American theologians
1879 births
1951 deaths
American Methodist clergy
Methodist writers